In the Hour of Chaos is a 2016 American documentary film directed by Bayer Mack about the life and trials of the Reverend Martin Luther King Sr. ("Daddy King"), father of civil rights leader Martin Luther King Jr.

The film's ensemble voice cast uses first-person narration sourced from autobiographies and biographies about Daddy King, family attorney Murray M. Silver and other King relatives and associates.

Synopsis
Set against a backdrop of sociopolitical intrigue and anarchy spanning three generations of the King family, In the Hour of Chaos also goes behind-the-scenes of America's major domestic conflicts and takes a critical view of liberalism's effect on the black civil rights movement.

Cast
 Jazz Walker as Martin Luther King Sr.
 Lynnette Holmes as Coretta Scott King
 Jason Dorough  as Murray M. Silver Sr. / Lester G. Maddox
 Ugo Anomelechi  as Bayard Rustin / Roy Wilkins
 Rachel Skyy as Ella Baker
 Sean O'Neil as Hoke Smith / Harris Wofford
 Malcolm X as himself

Release
In the Hour of Chaos was released on February 19, 2016 as part of a Black History Month event sponsored by the Greater Cleveland Urban Film Festival (GCUFF), which included writer/director Bayer Mack's debut film The Czar of Black Hollywood, and premiered on public television on July 25, 2016. The film was featured at San Francisco's de Young Museum as part of the Bay Area's "MLK Day of Revelations".

Accolades
In the Hour of Chaos was an official documentary selection of the 2017 San Francisco Black Film Festival and named Runner Up.

See also
Civil rights movement in popular culture
List of black films of the 2010s

References

External links 
Official Website

2016 documentary films
American documentary films
American independent films
Documentary films about African Americans
Films about race and ethnicity
Films about racism
African-American films
Films about Martin Luther King Jr.
Films about presidents of the United States
Films set in Atlanta
History of Atlanta
Documentary films about the civil rights movement
2010s English-language films
2010s American films